"She Don't Let Nobody (But Me)" is a song by American singer-songwriter Curtis Mayfield, included on his 1982 album Love Is the Place. It was released in 1981 as the first single from the album and reached  15 on the US Billboard Hot Soul Singles chart.

Charts

Chaka Demus & Pliers version

In 1993, Jamaican reggae duo Chaka Demus & Pliers covered the song as "She Don't Let Nobody" for their fourth album, Tease Me (1993). It was released as a single in late 1993 and was a top-20 hit in at least five countries, peaking at No. 4 in the United Kingdom, No. 9 in Ireland, and No. 12 in the Netherlands.

Critical reception
Larry Flick from Billboard wrote, "Reggae duo interprets a Curtis Mayfield evergreen with a warm and faithful hand. Delicate funk rhythms are injected with subtle island nuances. The vocal arrangement is handled in a similar fashion, as tuneful toasting is countered by smooth and easygoing crooning." In his weekly UK chart commentary, James Masterton felt that it "is ever more commercial than the last hit. Top Ten assured." James Hamilton, in Music Week'''s RM Dance Update, described the song as a "sweetly soulful swayer". Gavin Reeve from Smash Hits'' gave it three out of five, saying, "Mr Demus opens up his toolbox and builds another big reggae hit wit his friend Mr Pliers. This time around, they actually sing and quite good they are too." He deemed it "a slow-dance of a song".

Charts

Weekly charts

Year-end charts

Certifications

References

1981 songs
1981 singles
1993 singles
1994 singles
Curtis Mayfield songs
Chaka Demus & Pliers songs
Mango Records singles
Songs written by Curtis Mayfield
Songs written by Dino Fekaris
Song recordings produced by Curtis Mayfield
Song recordings produced by Sly & Robbie